The women's national discus championships are hosted by USA Track & Field at a venue voted on by the committee. The competition has been held in the United States since 1923, five years before it was added to the Olympic Games in 1928.

References

Discus